PNG or Png most often refers to:

 Papua New Guinea, a country in Oceania, in the southwestern Pacific Ocean
 Portable Network Graphics (.png), an image file format

PNG may also refer to:

Organisations
 Partidul Noua Generație, former name of a Romanian political party
 Port Neches–Groves High School, in Port Neches, Texas
 Philippine National Games, the national multi-sport tournament of the Philippines

Science and technology
 Piped natural gas, a gaseous fossil fuel delivered by pipeline
 Planetary nebula presented in galactic coordinates

Other uses
 Png (surname), a Min Nan Chinese surname
 Persona non grata, a Latin term meaning "an unwelcome person", used for a diplomat being pressured to leave another country
 Pongu language (ISO 639-3 code png), a Kainji language of Nigeria